Susan Bayly is a Professor Emerita of Historical Anthropology in the Cambridge University Division of Social Anthropology and a Life Fellow of Christ's College, Cambridge. She is a former editor of the Journal of the Royal Anthropological Institute.

Her research interests include the South Asian caste system. She was married to fellow Cambridge historian, Christopher Bayly, until his death in 2015.

Works

References 

British historians
British anthropologists
British women anthropologists
Fellows of Christ's College, Cambridge
Historians of India
British women historians
Living people
Year of birth missing (living people)
British women non-fiction writers